Policy Council may refer to:

Family policy council, organizations devoted to the advancement of children and family-related issues in the political sphere and society generally
Middle East Policy Council, a Washington DC based non-profit organization that deals with issues concerning the Middle East
Monetary Policy Council, a body of the National Bank of Poland (NBP)
Policy Council of Guernsey, the cabinet of ministers of Guernsey

See also
Foreign Policy Council